1000 Airplanes on the Roof is a melodrama in one act by Philip Glass which featured text by David Henry Hwang and projections by Jerome Sirlin.  It is described by Glass as "a science fiction music drama".

The work was commissioned by the Donau Festival, Krems an der Donau, The American Music Theater Festival, Philadelphia, and West Berlin City Council in 1988. It premiered on July 15, 1988, at the Vienna Airport in Hangar #3. The performance featured vocals by Linda Ronstadt and was conducted by Michael Riesman. The US premiere took place in September 1988 at The American Music Theater Festival, Philadelphia and went on to play in 40 US cities and Canada, including New York, Boston, Chicago and Toronto, as well as Glasgow, Scotland during that city's celebration as European City of Culture.

Synopsis
The drama is set in New York City with a sole character, "M", who recalls encounters with extraterrestrial life forms, including their message:
It is better to forget, it is pointless to remember. No one will believe you. You will have spoken a heresy. You will be outcast.
In the staged production, "M" performs in the midst of a three-dimensional, holographic set. In the classic sense of the word melodrama, the role is performed by an actor in a spoken monologue over music. Although in the world premiere, "M" was played by a male actor, the character was played alternately by female actor Jodie Long and male actor Patrick O'Connell in many of the US performances.

Recording
Philip Glass: 1000 Airplanes on the Roof (The Philip Glass Ensemble and Linda Ronstadt; Martin Goldray, Music Direction), 1989. Virgin 86106-2

Book
The libretto and images of the original set are published in:
Philip Glass, David Henry Hwang and Jerome Sirlin (Introduction by John Howell), 1001 Airplanes on the Roof, Salt Lake City: Peregrine Smith Book, 1989

References

Further reading
1000 Airplanes on the Roof at PhilipGlass.com.
Hedy Weiss Philip Glass pilots 'Airplanes' into inner reaches of the mind, (Review of the US premiere in Philadelphia), Chicago Sun-Times, September 29, 1988. Retrieved via subscription July 5, 2008.
John Rockwell, "A Mixing of Media From Philip Glass" (Review of the New York premiere performance, The New York Times, December 16, 1988. Retrieved July 5, 2008.
Kevin Kelly, 'Airplanes' can't sustain its fancy flights, (Review of the Boston premiere performance), The Boston Globe, September 20, 1989. Retrieved via subscription July 5, 2008.
James Schellenberg, Review of the book and CD, 1000 Airplanes on the Roof, Challenging Destiny, March 2001. Retrieved July 5, 2008.

Operas by Philip Glass
Philip Glass albums
English-language operas
Melodramas
Minimalist operas
1988 operas
Operas
Operas set in the United States